Bang Bang! is a 2014 Indian Hindi-language action comedy film directed by Siddharth Anand and written by Abbas Tyrewala, Sujoy Ghosh and Suresh Nair. Produced by Fox Star Studios, it is an official remake of the 2010 American film Knight and Day and stars Hrithik Roshan and Katrina Kaif, while co-starring Javed Jaffrey and Danny Denzongpa, with Jimmy Sheirgill in a special appearance. The film follows a mysterious thief on the run, whose encounter with an unassuming bank receptionist sets off a chain of events resulting in a series of escapades.

Also released with dubbed versions on the same date simultaneously in Telugu and Tamil, the film attracted praise towards its action sequences and grossed  globally to become the one of the top grossing Bollywood films of 2014 and the 38th highest grossing Indian film of all time.

Plot
After a treaty between India and the UK to expedite extradition of terrorist Omar Zafar to India is passed, Colonel Viren Nanda is murdered and burnt alive by Omar in London, during his escape from prison. Omar, who is escorted by his trusted lieutenant Hamid Gul, declares 50 million reward for an Indian thief to steal the Koh-i-Noor diamond, so as to uphold the treaty.

Later, a mysterious person named Rajveer alias Raj steals it, and demands 20 million as Zafar and Gul aim to retrieve it. After a subsequent brawl with Gul's men at a local restaurant in Shimla, Raj visits a restaurant where he meets an ambitious but unassuming bank receptionist, Harleen Sahni , who is waiting for her blind internet date, Vickie Kapoor, to show up. Raj assumes the date and the pair fall for each other, but he is forced to abandon her after being found by Gul's surviving men. Harleen leaves upon learning the truth, but on her way back home, bumps again into Raj, who seeks her help to remove a bullet. Before leaving, he drugs her with a sedative water and informs her of scare tactics that some law enforcement officials will try and coerce her into working against him.

As predicted, The government agents Zorawar Kalra  and his informer, Inspector Bhola (Pradeep Kabra) implore Harleen to travel with them to the police station, but instead head for a safe place, taking note of Raj's instructions, she finds a pistol and holds them at gunpoint. Raj arrives and the pair escape, but meet Harleen's manager Karan Saxena, who is shot in the leg by Raj. Harleen, perturbed, demands that she return home, having made a huge mistake by trusting him, which leads to an argument over their loyalties, but she eventually decides to stay upon realizing that he truly intends to protect her, and proceeds to accompany him. Raj later reveals during a visit to a Pizza Hut outlet that he stole the Koh-i-Noor, much to Harleen's surprise, and the pair are immediately confronted by Zorawar and his team, who had been following the duo. 

Raj tranquilizes Harleen and they escape with Harleen later waking up at a beach after an unknown period on the run. After she takes Raj's phone to call her grandmother, which allows government officials and subsequently Gul's men, led by his lieutenant Robert, to track them, a shootout ensues, which forces the duo to escape again after eliminating the officials and Robert's henchmen. Harleen wakes up the following morning in Prague; recognizing Raj's efforts in leading the escape, she regains her faith in him. Later, they track Gul down to a casino, and after a plot involving her, Raj ultimately kills Gul. Harleen is taken to the Indian Embassy, where she meets Zorawar and his boss, RAW Chief Narayanan as he gives her a tracking device to pinpoint Raj's location and retrieve the Koh-i-Noor. 

After another argument on a bridge as they try to escape, Raj activates the tracking device himself, gives the Koh-i-Noor to Harleen and gets shot while jumping off the bridge. Harleen returns home to reunite with her grandmother but begins to miss Raj; in a moment of epiphany, she locates his house where she meets Raj's father, Pankaj and his mother Shikha, posing as a delivery runner for Pankaj's book order. A tense moment results in Harleen trying to leave suddenly, when she soon bumps into photographs of Raj, who is revealed by Shikha to be Jai Nanda, Viren's brother; while Viren's murder is confirmed, Pankaj refuses to accept the army's version of the story behind Jai's death, as he pinpoints to a swimming championship trophy he had won in his young days, being the only person who was able to cross the lake in just one breath. 

Immediately outside her home, Harleen is kidnapped and taken to the interior of a desert castle, meets Zafar, who reveals that the surrendered diamond is a fake, while Zorawar turns out to be Zafar's informer; he gives Harleen a truth serum in an attempt to find the location of the real diamond, but she then deduces that Raj (Jai) is alive and is coming soon to kill Zafar and finish off his men. At the same time, Jai, who was assumed dead, plants time bombs and silently eliminates Zafar's henchmen who have been posted outside the castle. Inside the castle, Jai confronts Zafar, revealing that the Koh-i-Noor was not stolen at all and that it was a joint operation between the British Intelligence and the Indian RAW agencies to apprehend Zafar; in the conversation that follows, Jai intends to avenge Viren's death by killing Zafar. 

As the time bombs destroying the castle start going off, Zafar escapes with his remaining men while Jai escapes with Harleen, saving her all along; however, Zafar later blocks the duo, taking Harleen hostage and leaving with her on a seaplane; Jai eventually catches up, shooting down the seaplane to the ground and ultimately Zorawar in the process; following an intense confrontation, he kills Zafar after pushing Harleen out of the burning aircraft. Once he jumps out of the seaplane, which explodes seconds after Zafar's death, Jai loses consciousness and starts to drown, but is saved by Harleen as the army officers airlift the duo. Jai wakes up in a hospital, where he is informed by Narayanan, revealed to be his real boss, that he will not be allowed to see Harleen or his own family again. Harleen, posing as a nurse, then administers a sedative knocking him out and the pair escape.

In the mid-credits scene, after an unknown period on the run, Jai is eventually reunited with Pankaj and Shikha, as he finally introduces Harleen to them.

Cast
 Hrithik Roshan as Rajveer Nanda/Jai Nanda 
 Katrina Kaif as Harleen Sahni 
 Kanwaljit Singh as Pankaj Nanda 
 Deepti Naval as Shikha Nanda 
 Jimmy Sheirgill in a special appearance as Col. Viren Nanda
 Danny Denzongpa as Omar Zafar
 Javed Jaffrey as Hamid Gul
 Pawan Malhotra as Zorawar Kalra
 Vikram Gokhale as Narayanan, RAW Chief 
 Pradeep Kabra as Inspector Bhola
 Partha Akerkar as Robert Pandey
 Arsha Aghdasi as Goon
 Frank M. Ahearn as Bok Choy
 Amir Badri as Bad Man
 Steven Clarke as Henchman
 Jawed El Berni as The Chain Fighter
 Tina Grimm as Raver
 Damian Mavis as Gangster
 Bill O'Leary as Boat Goon Driver
 Desmond O'Neill as Henchman
 John Pasley as Henchman / Police Officer
 Aditya Prakash as Receptionist at Pizza Hut
 Anteo Quintavalle as Henchman
 Ron Smoorenburg as Henchman
 Ankur Vikal as Shoaib

Production

Casting

Earlier reports had suggested that Siddharth Anand, who had made Salaam Namaste, Ta Ra Rum Pum, Bachna Ae Haseeno and Anjaana Anjaani in the past, planned to make his next film with Shahid Kapoor, but Kapoor wanted to avoid comparisons with Tom Cruise and did not have availability of his dates for the film, as he had signed onto Haider. Bipasha Basu rumouredly was also on-board, but she eventually turned down the film. Soon news came that Anand was planning a film with Hrithik Roshan. In September 2012, Roshan was confirmed to play the lead role, with Katrina Kaif playing the female lead in the film. Roshan started working on the film immediately after wrapping up Krrish 3, and charged a  fee for his performance in the film, which until then was the most any actor in Bollywood had charged up front. The film was soon revealed to be the official Bollywood remake of Knight and Day, starring Tom Cruise and Cameron Diaz.

Makeup
In June 2014, the Bollywood group known as the Cine Costume Make-Up Artist & Hair Dressers' Association (CCMAA) authorized an official protest on the movie set of Bang Bang! in protest of foreign make-up artist Daniel Bauer working on the movie for its lead actress, Katrina Kaif. The CCMAA and 15 of its members protested on the movie set as Daniel Bauer was not registered with the Union, despite the Union banning foreign artists working in Bollywood. The issue was resolved with the CCMAA granting Daniel Bauer full membership.

Filming
In December 2012, it was confirmed that the official remake of Knight and Day would be titled Bang Bang. In March 2013, the film's Kashmir schedule was cancelled. Shooting for the film began on 1 May 2013, with the film scheduled for release on 1 May 2014. Unique water action sequences were shot in Thailand and Greece. In an interview with Mumbai Mirror, Roshan spoke about the action sequences in the film stating, "I have pushed myself to the extreme for this stunt. This sequence called for mental and physical tenacity. The rush that I experienced while training and executing the sequence was out of the world. I was hooked to a sea plane while I did the stunt. I had trained non-stop to even attempt the sequence". Roshan refused to use any body double to perform the stunts.

Talking about another water action sequences, the film's director Siddharth Anand revealed, "We can control the action we shoot on land, but while shooting at sea, you're at the mercy of the tide. Three days before the shoot, Hrithik started practicing the stunts for five-six hours daily. It took us eight days to shoot the sequences in water. For another water action sequence, Hrithik trained for four days, before the shooting. He learnt to jetski with a speed boat pulling him along first. Then, an antiquated plane was brought in with an experienced pilot at the controls, so that it could be slowed down and speeded up at will."

In July 2013, one of the songs of the film, "Meherbaan" was shot in the city of Santorini in Greece and choreographed by Ahmed Khan. In Phuket, Roshan performed a stunt where he had to use a water jetpack called a Flyboard and go 45 feet high in the sky and then dive down in the water. Roshan thus became the first actor in Hollywood or Bollywood to do a flyboarding stunt in a film. He was injured during this schedule and subsequently had to undergo a brain surgery for removal of a blood clot from his brain. Also, the Kashmir schedule of the film was delayed because of unrest in the valley.

The delays caused the film's release date to be postponed to 2 October 2014. Anand denied such reports, saying "It's funny! Yes, Bang Bang! is a big-ticket film but its budget is as per the scale of the film. There's no question of exceeding it." The shooting resumed in January 2014, in Shimla, Manali, Mumbai, Abu Dhabi, Delhi and Prague. The shooting schedule in Shimla went on for straight six weeks. The Manali bridge where the majority of scenes were shot, has become a grand tourist attraction and it was renamed as Bang Bang Point. Just before the Abu Dhabi segment of the film, a song shoot was completed at an open-cafeteria in Film City, Mumbai on 19 April 2014. Shimla was created in Film City, Mumbai to shoot a song and few action sequences for the film. The film was shot for 20 days in Film City with the lead pair . After wrapping up the Mumbai schedule, the filming team left for Abu Dhabi.

The Abu Dhabi schedule of shooting was intense and action-packed. In Abu Dhabi, filming started early May, and took place at various locations in Abu Dhabi including the Corniche, Liwa oasis, Hyatt Capital Gate Hotel, Qasr al Sarab, Emirates Palace and Yas Island. In one of the chase sequences in the film, 120 cars were involved. The film also had used Formula 1 cars. Even after the brain surgery, all the stunts were performed by Roshan himself. The stunts were designed by Andy Armstrong and shot in Abu Dhabi. The Abu Dhabi segment of shooting was completed on 20 May in collaboration with twofour54. It is the first Bollywood film to be shot and co-produced in Abu Dhabi. The last leg of the film was scheduled in Prague. One stunt in which Roshan is on water skis while being pulled along by a sky plane was shot in a lake in Prague. He trained for four days to shoot this scene. Shooting wrapped on 15 July 2014.

While filming in Thailand, Roshan suffered a head injury from a stunt accident and underwent brain surgery at  the Hinduja Hospital, done by Dr. B. K. Misra to relieve subacute-subdural hematoma.

Marketing

On the lines of the popular Ice Bucket Challenge – one of the biggest trends of the year, the dare on social media, Roshan came up with the dare-to-do game to Bollywood co-stars Aamir Khan, Shah Rukh Khan, Salman Khan, Nargis Fakhri, Sonam Kapoor, Ranveer Singh, Farhan Akhtar, Priyanka Chopra, Dino Morea, Uday Chopra and Dabboo Ratnani on Twitter asking them to post videos of themselves doing a particular task and adding the hashtag #bangbangdare to it. Roshan even dared the smokers asking them not to smoke for 3 days. One of the companies challenged Roshan himself, where he was asked to buy bed sheets from their store and if he did, ₹500,000 would be donated to city hospitals. He took up the dare sportingly. While most stars take to television shows to generate buzz about their films, Roshan refrained from promoting his movie through reality TV shows.

To protect the film from piracy, the makers of the film approached the Court of Piracy with the plea that the film should not be viewed on any device or broadcast on any platform through the Internet without their permission and submitted a list of 90 websites. The Court responded positively on that and restrained them all from making the film available on the Internet.

Soundtrack

The songs of the film were composed by Vishal–Shekhar, while the background score has been composed by Salim–Sulaiman. The digital album rights of the film were acquired by Zee Music Company.

The first look of the song "Tu Meri" was revealed on 20 August 2014 featuring Roshan and Kaif. On 21 August 2014, its official music video was released. The song was written and sung by Vishal Dadlani. The second song of the film "Meherbaan" featuring Hrithik Roshan and Katrina Kaif was released on 3 September 2014. This song was written by Anvita Dutt Guptan and sung by Ash King, Shilpa Rao and Shekhar Ravjiani. The teaser of the title song was released on 16 September 2014 featuring Roshan and Kaif. On 17 September 2014, the official music video of the song was released. The track was written by Dadlani, who also performed backing vocals on it, and sung by Benny Dayal and Neeti Mohan. It was choreographed by Bosco-Caesar. The song experience was "fun" for Roshan, who said, "It's my ode to the inspiration he [Michael Jackson] has been", while Kaif described her experience as "the biggest challenge. His flexibility is incredible. It is at a different level altogether. You have to be really good to match up to his energy. He has natural energy when he dances. It comes to him so effortlessly". All the songs were well received by audiences.

Hindi (Original Soundtrack)

Telugu (Dubbed Version)

Tamil  (Dubbed Version)

Critical reception

The film released worldwide on 2 October 2014.

Domestically, Bang Bang! received mixed to positive reviews from critics, who praised for its action sequences, humor and performances, but was criticized for its plot. 

Nandhini Srinivasan from FilmiBeat gave 3 out of 5 stars and recommended "this total action-packed fun entertainer for the long weekend holiday".

Paloma Sharma from Rediff, giving 2.5/5 rating to the film called it "a pointless official remake of an already bad original", while Raja Sen, again from Rediff, also gave 2/5 stars and wrote that the film is "a stupid, stupid film trying to be slick, a B-grade film made on an A-list budget.". Rajeev Masand on IBN Live gave the film 2/5 stars, commenting that "the film isn't unwatchable, but at 2 hours and 35 minutes, it certainly tests your patience".

The Indian Express rated it 1.5/5, calling Roshan "the eye candy of the film".

Box office
Worldwide, Bang Bang grossed , becoming one of the highest-grossing Bollywood films of 2014.

India
Bang Bang! The Tamil and Telugu versions of the film grossed around  nett.

Overseas
Bang Bang! earned $4.89 million overseas in its opening weekend. The biggest debut came from the UAE ($1.8 million), North America ($3.35 million), United Kingdom ($922,000).
At the end of its theatrical run overseas, the film earned $13.97 million. The highest revenue came from Gulf ($4.46 million), US/Canada ($2.62 million), UK (£1.165 million) and Australia (Aus $457,000).

Awards and nominations

References

External links
 
 
 

2010s Hindi-language films
2014 action comedy films
2010s spy comedy films
Indian action comedy films
2014 films
Films set in Himachal Pradesh
Films shot in Himachal Pradesh
Films shot in the United Arab Emirates
Films shot in Santorini
Films shot in Thailand
Films directed by Siddharth Anand
Films shot in the Czech Republic
Indian remakes of American films
IMAX films
Films scored by Vishal–Shekhar
Films set in Prague
Hindi remakes of English films
Films about the Research and Analysis Wing
Indian spy comedy films
Films shot in Manali, Himachal Pradesh
Fox Star Studios films
Reliance Entertainment films
2014 comedy films
Films shot in Greece